Plasminogen-related protein B is a protein that in humans is encoded by the PLGLB2 gene.

References

Further reading